Gyroscopic control may refer to:

 Control moment gyroscope, an attitude control device generally used in spacecraft attitude control systems
 Gyroscopic control (gaming), accelerometers to as a control input